The Bolombo River is a river in Équateur province, Democratic Republic of the Congo. The Bolombo is a tributary of the Lopori River. The Lopori River joins with the Maringa River to the south, to form the Lulonga River, a tributary of the Congo River. The Bolombo flows through the Lopori / Maringa basin, also known as the Maringa-Lopori-Wamba forest Landscape, an area of great ecological importance.

The major tributaries of the Bolombo include the Bloia River, the Loniuka and the Lololu.

References 

Rivers of the Democratic Republic of the Congo